This is a list of first overall Canadian Football League draft picks.  The CFL Draft is an annual sports draft in which the teams of the Canadian Football League (CFL) select eligible Canadian/non-import players, typically from the ranks of U Sports football or NCAA college football. The first official draft took place in 1953, with Doug McNichol becoming the first player to be drafted and was therefore drafted first overall. This list does not include the 1952 IRFU College Draft due to its unofficial status. While only the eastern teams participated for the first three years, all nine teams began participating in the 1956 draft. From 1960 to 1962, however, due to a dispute over talent from western universities and a reluctance of eastern draftees to move west, BC, Edmonton, Saskatchewan, and Winnipeg were awarded territorial rights to players from their city's university. Because Calgary had no university program in their territory, they continued to participate in the draft during these three years. From 1973 to 1984, teams were granted territorial rights players before the actual draft took place, hence, players listed in those years were actually drafted later. Since 2016, in non-pandemic years, the draft has consisted of eight rounds, with teams selecting in reverse order of their placement in the previous season.

List of first overall picks

Eastern draft

National draft

Modern era

Foreign drafts

Statistics

 Since 1956, Simon Fraser University and the University of Western Ontario hold the record for most first overall picks with five apiece. Among NCAA schools, the only ones with more than one first overall pick are Washington State University and Weber State University, each with two. (Although Simon Fraser is now an NCAA member, it has not had a top overall pick since joining that body.)
 Since 1956, the Toronto Argonauts have had the most first overall picks with 11.
 The Montreal Alouettes have gone the longest without a first overall draft pick, after selecting first in 1972 and then waiting until 2022 before picking first again. The Alouettes have also had the fewest first overall selections with three.
 Only two first overall draft selections have been awarded the CFL's Most Outstanding Rookie since the award was created in 1972; Orville Lee in 1988 and Jordan Williams in 2021.
 No team has ever made the first overall draft pick for more than three straight years.

References

External links
 CFL Canadian Draft
 Draft results 1970–present

draft picks
 
First-overall draft picks